Dennis J. Collins (November 21, 1900 – September 5, 1974) was an American lawyer, farmer, and businessman.

Biography 
Collins was born in Gifford, Illinois. In 1910, Collins moved with his family to DeKalb, Illinois and went to the DeKalb public schools. Collins graduated from University of Illinois and Northwestern University School of Law. Collins also went to Northern Illinois University. He was admitted to the Illinois bar in 1928 and practiced law in DeKalb, Illinois. Collins was also a farmer and owned commercial property. He served in the Illinois House of Representatives from 1931 to 1943 and in the Illinois Senate from 1943 until 1973. He was a Republican. Collins died in DeKalb, Illinois.

References

1900 births
1974 deaths
People from Champaign County, Illinois
People from DeKalb, Illinois
University of Illinois alumni
Northern Illinois University alumni
Northwestern University Pritzker School of Law alumni
Farmers from Illinois
Businesspeople from Illinois
Illinois lawyers
Republican Party members of the Illinois House of Representatives
Republican Party Illinois state senators
20th-century American politicians
20th-century American businesspeople
20th-century American lawyers